The Hits Live is the title of a live compilation album released in 2000 by the American country music band Sawyer Brown. The album comprises fourteen live renditions of their 1980s and 1990s country hits recorded on tour from late 1999 to early 2000, with the majority coming from a show in Ogden, Utah. The single "800 Pound Jesus" is from their 1999 album Drive Me Wild. The other three tracks—"Perfect World", "Garage Band" and a cover of Johnny Lee's "Lookin' for Love"—are new to this album. "Perfect World" and "Lookin' for Love" were both released as singles, respectively peaking at #50 and #44 on the country charts.

Track listing
"Six Days on the Road" (Carl Montgomery, Earl Green) – 2:58
Recorded live December 17, 1999 in Joliet, Illinois
"Hard to Say" (Mark Miller) – 3:19
Recorded live February 25, 2000 in Ogden, Utah
"This Time" (Miller, Mac McAnally) – 2:38
Recorded live February 25, 2000 in Ogden, Utah
"Cafe on the Corner" (McAnally) – 3:20
Recorded live November 6, 1999 in Taylorville, Illinois
"The Walk" (Miller) – 3:47
Recorded live December 19, 1999 in Spirit Lake, Idaho
"Step That Step" (Miller) – 3:01
Recorded live January 26, 2000 in Mt. Pleasant, Michigan
"The Dirt Road" (Gregg Hubbard, Miller) – 3:08
Recorded live December 17, 1999 in Joliet, Illinois
"This Night Won't Last Forever" (Bill LaBounty, Roy Freeland) – 3:43
Recorded live November 6, 1999 in Taylorville, Illinois
"All These Years" (McAnally) – 3:49
Recorded live December 28, 1999 in Nashville, Tennessee
"The Boys and Me" (McAnally, Miller) – 4:27
Recorded live February 25, 2000 in Ogden, Utah
"Thank God for You" (McAnally, Miller) – 2:56
Recorded live February 25, 2000 in Ogden, Utah
"The Race Is On" (Don Rollins) – 3:04
Recorded live February 25, 2000 in Ogden, Utah
"Drive Me Wild" (Hubbard, Miller, Mike Lawler) – 3:29
Recorded live November 19, 1999 in Warsaw, Indiana
"Some Girls Do" (Miller) – 3:47
Recorded live February 25, 2000 in Ogden, Utah
"Perfect World" (Miller, Chuck Cannon, Billy Maddox, Paul Thorn) – 3:18
"Garage Band" (Miller) – 3:34
"800 Pound Jesus" (Maddox, Thorn) – 2:51
"Lookin' for Love" (Wanda Mallette, Bob Morrison, Pat Ryan) – 3:36

Personnel 
As listed in liner notes.

Sawyer Brown
 Mark Miller – lead vocals
 Gregg "Hobie" Hubbard – keyboards, backing vocals
 Duncan Cameron – lead guitars, backing vocals
 Joe Erkman – rhythm guitars (support on live shows)
 Jim Scholten – bass
 Joe "Curley" Smyth – drums, percussion 
 Jimmy Myers – percussion (support on live shows)

Additional musicians
 Bernie Herms – keyboards, acoustic piano
 Blair Masters – keyboards
 Brian Tankersley – programming 
 George Cocchini – guitars
 Michael Hodge – guitars
 Jerry McPherson – guitars
 Dale Oliver – guitars
 Lonnie Wilson – drums, percussion

Production 
 Mark A. Miller – producer 
 Brian Tankersley – producer, recording, mixing 
 Bob Blesius – live music recording 
 Sam Hewitt – recording assistant, additional live recording 
 Sandy Williams – recording assistant, additional live recording
 Hank Williams – mastering 
 Monica Mercer – art direction, design 
 Dean Dixon – photography 
 Henry Diltz – live photography 
 Rick Malkin – live photography 
 Paige Molesworth – hair, make-up

Studios
 Recorded at GBT Studio (Nashville, Tennessee); Sound Kitchen (Franklin, Tennessee); Dream Valley.
 Mixed at GBT Studio
 Mastered at MasterMix (Nashville, Tennessee).

Chart performance

References

2000 live albums
Sawyer Brown live albums
Curb Records live albums